Lenni Brenner (born 1937), formerly known as Leonard Glaser or Lenny Glaser,  is an American Trotskyist writer. In the 1960s, Brenner was a prominent civil rights movement activist and vocal opponent of the Vietnam War. Since the 1980s, his activism has focused on anti-Zionism. He has published widely on the history of Zionism, in particular asserting that the movement collaborated with the Nazis.

Early life
Brenner was born into an Orthodox Jewish family in 1937. He says he developed an early interest in history from reading Hendrik Willem van Loon's The Story of Mankind at age seven, which his brother had received as a bar mitzvah present. He had no interest in Jewish issues until around 1973, since, Brenner has remarked, he hailed from a milieu that frequented the synagogue only until the bar mitzvah rite was completed.

Political activity
Brenner has recounted that his involvement with the Civil Rights Movement began when he met James Farmer of the Congress of Racial Equality, later the organizer of the Freedom Rides of the early 1960s. He also worked with Bayard Rustin, later the organizer of Martin Luther King Jr.'s 1963 March on Washington for Jobs and Freedom. Brenner was arrested three times during civil rights sit-ins in the San Francisco Bay Area,  In an article in the San Francisco Examiner Brenner, together with Mike Myerson, was identified as a member of the W.E.B. Du Bois youth wing of the Communist Party of the United States (CPUSA) within the Ad Hoc Committee to End Discrimination (AHCED).

Berkeley 1964, arrest and imprisonment
Brenner, then known as Glaser, came to Berkeley in 1962. A bid to enroll in the orthodox Trotskyite Socialist Workers Party was rejected though he was permitted to join its youth branch, from which he was expelled for ignoring an order that he desist from talking about drug reform at street rallies. In February 1964, he was arrested on a drug charge and put on probation for marijuana possession.

Though a non-student, Brenner at UC had become by this time a long-time campus orator, a familiar if solitary figure on the Berkeley campus (UC), where he delivered passionate tirades to passing students while protesting issues like Kennedy's handling of the Cuban Missile Crisis and the papal opposition to birth control, while also advocating for the legalization of marijuana. On the missile crisis he once delivered a non-stop speech from noon to midnight at Bancroft and Telegraph Avenue in 1962. That venue was not thought to be on University property.  The UC, under Chancellor Clark Kerr, who believed Communist influence lay behind the Free Speech Movement (FSM),  had recently banned political activities on campus, and speakers were obliged to address passers-by outside, on city-owned property, though card-tables with leaflets were permitted a few steps inside. On September 14, 1964, the University administration extended its ban, in effect from the 21st., to these card tables on the 26 foot brick walkway, technically also University property, just outside the campus entrance. The tightening of this regulation triggered a wave of defiance, with students challenging the order by moving the card-tables inside the campus grounds.

On October 1, 1964, Jack Weinberg a student of mathematics who had graduated with great distinction, challenged the ruling by setting up one such card table in Sproul Plaza. He was collecting funds for Congress of Racial Equality(CORE): a number of campus activists at the time, including philosophy student Mario Savio, were spending their summers aiding the civil rights movement to get Afro-Americans to register for a vote in the face of Ku Klux Klan violence.

After Weinberg refused to identify himself to emissaries of the dean, a lieutenant from the campus police was called in and informed him of the infraction. Outnumbered, the policeman then left and came back with three more officers who arrested Weinberg for trespass and for violating the regulation against political activity. Weinberg, using a passive disobedience technique, went limp and had to be hauled to a police car, which was almost immediately encircled by hundreds of students. Brenner, In what has been described as an "historic event," is generally reported to have been the first in the crowd to try and physically block the exit of the police vehicle detaining Weinberg by Weinberg by rolling under it. Several hundred joined him and the car remained "entrapped" for 32 hours. In response, 643 police were assembled on the campus by 2 October. The hood of the car was turned into a platform where Savio, and one source claims Brenner himself, made speeches and Joan Baez sang before a growing student crowd of thousands.

Brenner, though present, later stated he was opposed to the ensuing demonstration, and that he had approached the car and asked Weinberg if he wanted to get out. Weinberg replied negatively saying that his presence there was of symbolic value. The University authorities regarded Brenner as a trouble-maker. Some days after the incident, the University police contacted Brenner's probation officer expressing concern that his exceptional rhetorical talents might induce "mob action or violence" on the campus. According to David Goines, Brenner was then arrested when a policemen observed him accepting a beer from a passer-by and charged him with drinking in public. This charge signified legally that he had violated the terms of his three year probation.

Lewis Feuer frequently referred to Brenner (Glaser) as the nihilistic Nechayev of the FSM, the evil genius behind the movement. The UC sent a representative to testify against Brenner's probation while Brenner was denied the right to call witnesses on his own behalf. The court ruling revoked his probation on the grounds that he had obstructed police in the execution of their duties. He was sentenced to 1 to 10 years' imprisonment. Brenner's appeal against his conviction was turned down by Judge Richard Sims who however, according to Brenner, wrote that he was troubled by Judge Dieden's ruling. For Sims, Brenner was not a felon. If he were mentally ill, referral to an appropriate institution would have been proper. Were he a trespassing social malcontent, he should have been judged for a normal misdemeanour.

UC faculty scholar William Petersen wrote an extensive report on the incident which, on 17 May 1965, was read into a Senate inquiry into putative Communist influence on American universities  into internal security laws. In it Petersen described Brenner as  a convicted narcotics user who assaulted police. Brenner subsequently spent 39 months in jail at California Men's Colony. In the Oakland lockup, while waiting to be sent to the state penitentiary, he met and had intense discussions with Huey Newton. He recalls that his time in prison enabled him to read widely in the library, enjoy free medical care, and engage with some of the "most impressive & intelligent people" he encountered in the 60s decade.

Brenner was released on January 22, 1968, after serving a term of 3 years and 3 months. In a memoir of the period, one of the FSM leaders, Michael Rossman argued that the movement, in failing to stand by Brenner when he was targeted by the authorities, had effectively betrayed him and his distinctive campus voice.

Latter activism
Brenner joined in the Free Speech Movement when it emerged on campus in the mid-1960s. He was an anti-war activist during the Vietnam War. In 1968 he co-founded the National Association for Irish Justice, the American affiliate of the Northern Ireland Civil Rights Association.

In the 1990s, he and the Black Power leader Kwame Ture (aka Stokely Carmichael) co-founded a Committee against Zionism and Racism. They also published The Anti-War Activist. In the early 2000s, he also became active in endeavouring to organize a Coalition for Narcotic Law Reform in the US.

Brenner spoke at an Israeli Apartheid Week event in 2011 at Berlin, Connecticut. According to the Anti-Defamation League, at an event called "One State Solution" at the Islamic Association of Greater Hartford, Brenner said that Jews were the largest donors to American political parties and that the political system is as "crooked as a dog's hind leg". He also stated that President Truman recognised Israel because of contributions from Jews.

Writing
His books have been widely translated and reviewed in 11 languages. His books have been reviewed in the London Times, the London Review of Books, Booklist magazine, and the Washington Report on Middle East Affairs.

His articles have also appeared in publications related to the Middle East and identifying with the political left, including The Nation, Amsterdam News, Atlanta Constitution, Washington Report on Middle East Affairs, Middle East Policy, Journal of Palestine Studies, New Statesman, Al-Fajr and United Irishman.

The Institute for Historical Review, a Holocaust denial platform, has cited, promoted, and sold Brenner's work. Brenner has opposed his work being used by those on the far right, and those engaged in Holocaust denial. Antisemitism scholar Kenneth S. Stern has described Brenner as antisemitic and anti-Zionist.  Brenner says that since he is Jewish, rather than being called an "anti-Semite", he is often called a "self-hating Jew".

Anti-Zionist activist Uri Davis positively reviewed both Zionism in the Age of the Dictators (1983) and The Iron Wall (1984) for Race and Class. He said that both works contained invaluable information and documentation, but had uneven quality. In Davis's view, the former book was an important "work informed by the moral and the political insight of the author as an anti-Zionist scholar". Davis found the thrust of the latter study, despite its impeccable documentation, somewhat weakened by passages of "pseudo-Freudian causal explanations" that Brenner wrote to supplement his political analysis. Secondly Davis says that Brenner makes "repeated irresponsible political statements verging on the nonsensensical", such as Brenner's notion that, were it not for the presence of the British army, the tiny Zionist yishuv would have been driven into the sea.

In 2016, British socialist politician Ken Livingstone praised Brenner's book Zionism in the Age of the Dictators while defending comments he made about Adolf Hitler which were widely considered antisemitic, helping to spark a controversy about Antisemitism in the UK Labour Party. Historian of Nazi Germany Michael Burleigh said that Brenner and Livingstone "strain[ed] the objectively episodic and marginal into something maliciously significant".

Bibliography
Brenner has authored, co-authored and edited a number of books:

 Zionism in the Age of the Dictators – which argued that many Zionist leaders collaborated with fascism, particularly Nazi Germany in order to build up the Jewish presence in Palestine. First printed in 1983, reprinted in 2014. It has been translated into Japanese: Fuashizumu jidai no shionizumu, by Shiba Kensuke (芝健介), Hōsei Daigaku 2001, German (in a revised edition), as Zionismus und Faschismus: über die unheimliche Zusammenarbeit von Zionisten und Faschisten, tr. Verena Gajewski Homilius, Kai, Berlin 2007, and Spanish as Sionismo y Fascismo, by Luis César Bou, Bósforo Libros, Madrid, 2010.
 The Iron Wall: Zionist Revisionism from Jabotinsky to Shamir, first published in 1984 by Zed Books, London.
 Jews in America Today
 The Lesser Evil (1988) – a study of the United States Democratic Party
 51 Documents: Zionist Collaboration with the Nazis (2002) Barricade Books – This book has been translated to Spanish by Luis César Bou as 51 Documentos Sobre la Colaboración Sionista con los Nazis Editorial Canaán, Buenos Aires, 2012. – translations of many of the documents quoted in Zionism in the Age of the Dictators and The Iron Wall
 Jefferson & Madison On Separation of Church and State: Writings on Religion and Secularism
 Black Liberation and Palestine Solidarity (2013)– a collection of selected essays that "discusses the historical response of African American freedom movements to the colonial settler state of Israel and its role in American Imperialism in the Middle East."

Wider views
 Brenner is said to have read legal works extensively during his incarceration, and to have become contemptuous of law generally and the Supreme Court in particular (making an exception of the Fourth Chief Justice of the United States, John Marshall. In his viewThe wind blows a piece of paper into the law courts and it takes a yoke of oxen to get it out.
 In protesting the ban on marijuana use, Brenner framed his case in terms of the United States Constitution. The personal use of marijuana was a widespread, "trivial" and customary habit and, he argued, therefore was protected by the unenumerated rights alluded to in the 9th Amendment, according to which, "(t)he enumeration in the constitution of certain rights shall not be construed to deny or disparage others retained by the People."

Notes

Citations

Sources

External links
 Interview with Lenni Brenner by JK Fowler for The Mantle March 19, 2011

1937 births
21st-century American historians
Activists for African-American civil rights
American anti–Vietnam War activists
American male non-fiction writers
American political writers
American Trotskyists
Historians of Jews and Judaism
Historians of Nazism
Historians of the United States
Jewish American atheists
Jewish American historians
Jewish anti-Zionism in the United States
Jewish socialists
Living people
Writers on Zionism